Pemberton Place, located in downtown Atlanta, Georgia, just north of Centennial Olympic Park in the Luckie Marietta district, is a complex that is home to the Georgia Aquarium, the World of Coca-Cola, and the Center for Civil and Human Rights. It is named after John Pemberton, the inventor of Coca-Cola.

History
The area was originally ten city blocks of businesses, residences, etc.; it started to decline in the mid-20th century and by the early 1990s was considered a "long forgotten district of downtown". The Coca-Cola Company acquired property in the area and built Coca-Cola Olympic City there, for the 1996 Olympics. The company then donated the land in 2002, to provide a home for visitor attractions.

Georgia Aquarium

The world's third largest aquarium with more than 8.1 million US gallons  (31,000 m³) of marine and fresh water, housing more than 100,000 animals of 500 different species. The aquarium's notable specimens include four young whale sharks, including Alice and Trixie, four beluga whales named Qinu, Aurek, Maple, and Nunavik, and two manta rays, Nandi and Tallulah.

World of Coca-Cola

The World of Coca-Cola is a permanent exhibition featuring the history of the Coca-Cola Company and its well-known advertising, plus a host of entertainment areas and attractions.

Center for Civil and Human Rights

The Center for Civil and Human Rights in downtown Atlanta is an engaging cultural attraction that connects the Civil Rights Movement to the global human rights movement. The center will feature four interactive and thought-provoking exhibitions, including a gallery for continually-rotating exhibits of items from the Morehouse College Martin Luther King, Jr., Collection, where visitors can view the personal papers and items of Dr. King. The Center will also provide designated event spaces and educational programs inspiring visitors to join the ongoing dialogue about contemporary movements for human rights around the world.

References

 "Pemberton Place to be home to aquarium, World of Coke", Atlanta Business Chronicle, November 9, 2005
 "Center for Civil and Human Rights set for Pemberton Place", Atlanta Business Chronicle, September 15, 2008

Landmarks in Atlanta
Geography of Atlanta
Coca-Cola
Tourist attractions in Atlanta